Deman is a surname. Notable people with the surname include:

Olivier Deman (born 2000), Belgian footballer
Paul Deman (1889–1961), Belgian cyclist
Robert Deman, American actor

See also
De Man
Demann
Geman